Sir John Nesbitt Gordon Johnson, CSI, CIE (25 February 1885 – 9 June 1955), known as Sir Gordon Johnson, was a British administrator in India. A member of the Indian Civil Service, he was Chief Commissioner of Delhi from 1932 to 1937.

References 

Knights Bachelor
1955 deaths
Indian Civil Service (British India) officers
People educated at Rossall School
Alumni of The Queen's College, Oxford
British Indian Army officers
Companions of the Order of the Star of India
Companions of the Order of the Indian Empire
Members of the Council of State (India)